In solid geometry, a face is a flat surface (a planar region) that forms part of the boundary of a solid object; a three-dimensional solid bounded exclusively by faces is a polyhedron.

In more technical treatments of the geometry of polyhedra and higher-dimensional polytopes, the term is also used to mean an element of any dimension of a more general polytope (in any number of dimensions).

Polygonal face
In elementary geometry, a face is a polygon on the boundary of a polyhedron. Other names for a polygonal face include polyhedron side and Euclidean plane tile.

For example, any of the six squares that bound a cube is a face of the cube. Sometimes "face" is also used to refer to the 2-dimensional features of a 4-polytope. With this meaning, the 4-dimensional tesseract has 24 square faces, each sharing two of 8 cubic cells.

Number of polygonal faces of a polyhedron

Any convex polyhedron's surface has Euler characteristic

where V is the number of vertices, E is the number of edges, and F is the number of faces. This equation is known as Euler's polyhedron formula. Thus the number of faces is 2 more than the excess of the number of edges over the number of vertices. For example, a cube has 12 edges and 8 vertices, and hence 6 faces.

k-face
In higher-dimensional geometry, the faces of a polytope are features of all dimensions. A face of dimension k is called a k-face. For example, the polygonal faces of an ordinary polyhedron are 2-faces. In set theory, the set of faces of a polytope includes the polytope itself and the empty set, where the empty set is for consistency given a "dimension" of −1. For any n-polytope (n-dimensional polytope), −1 ≤ k ≤ n.

For example, with this meaning, the faces of a cube comprise the cube itself (3-face), its (square) facets (2-faces), (linear) edges (1-faces), (point) vertices (0-faces), and the empty set. The following are the faces of a 4-dimensional polytope:

4-face – the 4-dimensional 4-polytope itself
3-faces – 3-dimensional cells (polyhedral faces)
2-faces – 2-dimensional ridges (polygonal faces)
1-faces – 1-dimensional edges
0-faces – 0-dimensional vertices
the empty set, which has dimension −1

In some areas of mathematics, such as polyhedral combinatorics, a polytope is by definition convex. Formally, a face of a polytope P is the intersection of P with any closed halfspace whose boundary is disjoint from the interior of P. From this definition it follows that the set of faces of a polytope includes the polytope itself and the empty set.

In other areas of mathematics, such as the theories of abstract polytopes and star polytopes, the requirement for convexity is relaxed. Abstract theory still requires that the set of faces include the polytope itself and the empty set.

Cell or 3-face 
A cell is a polyhedral element (3-face) of a 4-dimensional polytope or 3-dimensional tessellation, or higher. Cells are facets for 4-polytopes and 3-honeycombs.

Examples:

Facet or (n − 1)-face 
In higher-dimensional geometry, the facets (also called hyperfaces) of a n-polytope are the (n-1)-faces (faces of dimension one less than the polytope itself). A polytope is bounded by its facets.

For example:
The facets of a line segment are its 0-faces or vertices.
The facets of a polygon are its 1-faces or edges.
The facets of a polyhedron or plane tiling are its 2-faces.
The facets of a 4D polytope or 3-honeycomb are its 3-faces or cells.
The facets of a 5D polytope or 4-honeycomb are its 4-faces.

Ridge or (n − 2)-face 
In related terminology, the (n − 2)-faces of an n-polytope are called ridges (also subfacets). A ridge is seen as the boundary between exactly two facets of a polytope or honeycomb.

For example:
The ridges of a 2D polygon or 1D tiling are its 0-faces or vertices.
The ridges of a 3D polyhedron or plane tiling are its 1-faces or edges.
The ridges of a 4D polytope or 3-honeycomb are its 2-faces or simply faces.
The ridges of a 5D polytope or 4-honeycomb are its 3-faces or cells.

Peak or (n − 3)-face 
The (n − 3)-faces of an n-polytope are called peaks. A peak contains a rotational axis of facets and ridges in a regular polytope or honeycomb.

For example:
The peaks of a 3D polyhedron or plane tiling are its 0-faces or vertices.
The peaks of a 4D polytope or 3-honeycomb are its 1-faces or edges.
The peaks of a 5D polytope or 4-honeycomb are its 2-faces or simply faces.

See also
 Face lattice

Notes

References

External links
 
 
 

Elementary geometry
Convex geometry
Polyhedra
Planar surfaces

de:Fläche (Mathematik)